Sophie Labelle is a Canadian cartoonist, public speaker, and writer. She is known for her webcomic Assigned Male, which draws upon her experiences as a trans girl and woman. She is an activist in the transgender rights movement, and speaks on the subjects of trans history and transfeminism.

Early life
Labelle grew up in rural Quebec, near Châteauguay. She worked as an elementary school teacher, and was the camp coordinator for Gender Creative Kids Canada.

Career
Labelle is the author and illustrator of Assigned Male, a webcomic and series of zines addressing issues of gender norms and privilege. It features the character of 11-year-old Stephie, a trans girl discovering and embracing her gender. Labelle said that while working with transgender children, she "noticed how negative everything we tell them about their own body is, so I wanted to create a character that could respond to all those horrible things trans kids hear all the time." She has made educational guides to go along with the comics, promoting safer spaces for trans youth. The Washington Blade called the webcomic "hilarious" and said it shows transgender humour can be funny without being offensive.

Labelle has written several books and zines about gender identity and expression, including The Genderific Coloring Book, A Girl Like Any Other, Ciel at Camp Fabulous, and Gender Euphoria. The English translation of the second volume of the Ciel series, Ciel in All Directions (2020, Second Story Press) was named as a 2022 Bank Street Children's Book Committee's Best Books of the Year. She wrote the foreword to Tikva Wolf's book Ask me about Polyamory: The Best of Kimchi Cuddles. She has created trans-centered sex education materials for Trans Student Educational Resources.

In May 2017 Labelle released the comic book Dating Tips for Trans and Queer Weirdos. A scheduled launch at the bookstore Venus Envy in Halifax was cancelled after threats were made against both her and the store. She received death threats, her home address was posted in online forums, and her web site and social media accounts were compromised (which she temporarily took offline). In the wake of the harassment, Labelle advocated for Canadian Bill C-16 to protect gender identity and expression, and for stronger laws against cyberbullying.

Works

References

External links 

 

1988 births
Artists from Quebec
Canadian cartoonists
Canadian women cartoonists
Canadian feminists
Canadian webcomic creators
Canadian female comics artists
Female comics writers
LGBT comics creators
Canadian LGBT rights activists
Living people
People from Châteauguay
Transfeminists
Transgender rights activists
Transgender artists
Transgender women
Canadian transgender writers
Writers from Quebec
Canadian comics writers
21st-century Canadian women writers
21st-century Canadian LGBT people